Einar Galilea Azaceta (born 22 May 1994) is a Spanish professional footballer who plays for Croatian club NK Istra 1961 as either a central defender or a midfielder.

Formed at Alavés, he spent most of his career in the Croatian Football League, making over 100 appearances mainly for Istra 1961 and also for Rudeš.

Football career

Alavés
Born in Vitoria-Gasteiz, Álava, Galilea finished his formation with his hometown club Deportivo Alavés, and made his senior debut with the reserves in the 2012–13 campaign. On 19 May 2013, as the Basque side were already in the play-offs, he made his first team debut, coming on as a substitute in a 3–1 win at CD Izarra.

On 4 January 2014 Galilea made his debut as a professional, again from the bench in a 2–0 success at CD Numancia in the Segunda División championship. On 20 August he was definitely promoted to the main squad, and renewed his link until 2017 on 2 September.

After the club's promotion to La Liga, it was announced on 18 August 2016 that Galilea would return to the B-side, but still being involved with the first team. He scored his first senior goal ten days later, netting the second in a 4–0 Tercera División home routing of Santutxu FC.

On 16 January 2017, despite being injured, Galilea renewed his contract for two more seasons. Roughly one year later, he was loaned to NK Rudeš until June.

Galilea renewed his contract until 2021 on 9 June 2018, and was loaned to Ligue 2 side FC Sochaux-Montbéliard eleven days later.

Istra 1961
In January 2019, Galilea left Sochaux and went on loan again to NK Istra 1961. On 30 August 2020, the deal was extended for a further season.

Galilea scored his first goal for the team from Pula on 21 April 2021, in a 2–1 home loss to rivals HNK Rijeka. On 19 May, he played in the 2021 Croatian Football Cup Final, lost 6–3 to GNK Dinamo Zagreb.

At the end of June 2021, Galilea's contract at Alavés expired, and he joined Istra 1961 permanently.

Career statistics

Club

Honours
Alavés
Segunda División: 2015–16

References

External links

 
 
 
 

1994 births
Living people
Footballers from Vitoria-Gasteiz
Spanish footballers
Association football defenders
Segunda División players
Segunda División B players
Tercera División players
Deportivo Alavés B players
Deportivo Alavés players
Croatian Football League players
NK Rudeš players
NK Istra 1961 players
Ligue 2 players
FC Sochaux-Montbéliard players
Spanish expatriate footballers
Spanish expatriate sportspeople in Croatia
Spanish expatriate sportspeople in France
Expatriate footballers in Croatia
Expatriate footballers in France